Arkansas Highway 10 is an east–west state highway in West Arkansas. The route runs  from Oklahoma State Highway 120 near Hackett east to Interstate 30 in Little Rock, the state's capitol. The highway serves both the Fort Smith metropolitan area and the Little Rock – North Little Rock – Conway metropolitan area.

Aside from Little Rock in Pulaski County, the highway also passes through county seats in four other Arkansas counties — Greenwood, Sebastian County; Booneville, Logan County; Danville, Yell County; and Perryville, Perry County. Mount Magazine, Arkansas's highest point, lies just to the north of the highway, as does the adjoining Mount Magazine State Park.  Arkansas 10 also passes through a portion of the Ozark National Forest and parallel to the Petit Jean River, Petit Jean Wildlife Management Area and Lake Maumelle — a chief source of water for residents in the Little Rock metropolitan area.

Route description

The route begins at Oklahoma State Highway 120 and runs east to Hackett. AR 10 intersects AR 45 in Hackett, and continues east to Greenwood. AR 10 passes through downtown Greenwood, passing the lone AR 10 spur route and the Old Sebastian County Jail, which is listed on the National Register of Historic Places. The highway leaves town and passes Fort Chaffee on its way to Logan County. In Booneville, the route intersects the scenic AR 23 near the Bank of Booneville Building and Farmers and Merchants Bank-Masonic Lodge. AR 10 also passes the Booneville Municipal Airport before entering Magazine. The highway passes by the historic Magazine City Hall-Jail and intersects AR 109 in Magazine before entering Yell County.

AR 10 begins to cover mountainous terrain, passing Havana, Belleville, and the Danville Municipal Airport. Highway 10 intersects Arkansas Highway 27 in Danville and AR7/AR 28 in Ola. In Perry County, AR 10 continues through mountainous terrain and small towns Cass and Adona before forming a southerly concurrency with Arkansas Highway 9. AR 9/AR 10 run together pass Lake Harris Brake on to Perryville, past the Perry County Courthouse and south to Williams Junction, where AR 10 turns east to Little Rock.

Arkansas Highway 10 enters Pulaski County, passing Lake Maumelle and Pinnacle Mountain State Park before entering the city, becoming Cantrell Road. The far western portions of Cantrell Road in recent years have been the site for increased commercial development in Little Rock, including the controversial 2004 opening of a Wal-Mart Supercenter near upscale residential communities immediately south of the highway in Chenal Valley. In the portion between Interstate 430 in the west and downtown in the east, Arkansas 10/Cantrell Road (as classified by the regional governmental council, Metroplan) is a primary traffic artery for northern Little Rock, including the upper part of the Pulaski Heights section of the city, and is one of the most traveled thoroughfares aside from the Interstates in Little Rock. Cantrell Road runs with neighborhoods to the south and parks to the north, passing Arkansas Baptist High School.

The highway intersects Interstate 430 at a Parclo interchange and runs deeper into downtown Little Rock, passing numerous houses on the National Register of Historic Places. Cantrell Road continues past the Jackson Reservoir near the Cammack Village area, crossing University Avenue. AR 10 proceeds east past the Arkansas State Capitol along the Arkansas River and underneath Broadway Street (US 70), becoming LaHarpe Boulevard in downtown. The route uses one block of Cumberland Street, then continues as an extended on-ramp to I-30 near The Tavern and William J. Clinton Presidential Library, where it ends.

Greenwood spur

Its western terminus is at U.S. Route 71, just west of Greenwood, while its eastern terminus is at Arkansas Highway 10 near downtown Greenwood. Until the mid-1960s, this road was part of the original alignment of U.S. 71.

History

AR 10 was one of the original 1926 Arkansas State Highways, and remains very close to that routing today. Even in 1926, however, US 64 was constructed to higher standards than AR 10, making US 64 always the more feasible route for travelers from Fort Smith to the state capitol. AR 10 remains the "scenic path" from Fort Smith, passing through the Ouachita Mountains at a slower pace than the bustling four-lane limited-access highway.

Major intersections
Mile markers reset at concurrencies.

See also

References

External links

010
Transportation in Logan County, Arkansas
Transportation in Perry County, Arkansas
Transportation in Pulaski County, Arkansas
Transportation in Sebastian County, Arkansas
Transportation in Yell County, Arkansas